Brenda Bury (born 1932) is an English professional portrait artist based in Toronto.  She has painted members of the British Royal Family, the aristocracy, and politicians in the British and Canadian governments. She has painted Queen Elizabeth II, Margaret Thatcher and John Diefenbaker. Her portrait of Kenneth Tynan is in the National Portrait Gallery, London. Bury is married to John Polanyi.

Early life and education 
Bury was born in Brierley near Barnsley, England in 1932. When she was seven years old she won a National Savings painting competition and, at 12, won a youth club painting competition. She later studied Fine Art at the University of Reading with Antony Betts where she received her Bachelor of Fine Arts. As a student, she was given brushes originally owned by James McNeill Whistler by a Reading University Professor.

References

1932 births
Living people
20th-century English painters
20th-century Canadian painters
20th-century English women artists
20th-century Canadian women artists
21st-century Canadian painters
21st-century English painters
21st-century Canadian women artists
21st-century English women artists
Alumni of the University of Reading
English women painters
English portrait painters
Canadian portrait painters
Canadian women painters